In mathematics, especially in the fields of universal algebra and graph theory, a graph algebra is a way of giving a directed graph an algebraic structure.  It was introduced by McNulty and Shallon, and has seen many uses in the field of universal algebra since then.

Definition 
The graph algebra associated with  has underlying set , and is equipped with a multiplication defined by the rules

Applications 
This notion has made it possible to use the methods of graph theory in universal algebra and several other directions of discrete mathematics and computer science. Graph algebras have been used, for example, in constructions concerning dualities, equational theories, flatness, groupoid rings, topologies, varieties, finite state automata, finite-state machines,
tree languages and tree automata, etc.

See also 
 Group algebra (disambiguation)
 Incidence algebra
 Path algebra

Citations

Works cited

Further reading

Graph theory
Universal algebra